Coffeeville Lock and Dam are located on the Tombigbee River in Choctaw County, Alabama near the town of Coffeeville operated by the US Army Corps of Engineers. Construction on the lock began in 1956 and while the lock was operational in 1960, all works were not completed until 1965. They were originally known as Jackson Lock and Dam.

References

Reservoirs in Alabama
Dams in Alabama
Dams completed in 1965
1965 establishments in Alabama
Bodies of water of Choctaw County, Alabama
Buildings and structures in Alabama
Locks of Alabama